Mechanix is the tenth studio album by English hard rock band UFO, released in February 1982 by Chrysalis Records.

Music press adverts carried the tagline, 'Mechanix: it will tighten your nuts.'

Immediately after the accompanying tour, founding member Way left to join former Motörhead guitarist "Fast" Eddie Clarke in Fastway.

Mechanix was reissued in 1994 on Repertoire Records. It was also reissued in 2009, remastered and with an expanded booklet and bonus tracks.

Track listing

Personnel
UFO
Phil Mogg – vocals
Paul Chapman – lead guitar
Neil Carter – keyboards, rhythm guitar, backing vocals, sax, orchestral arrangements
Pete Way – bass
Andy Parker – drums

Production
Gary Lyons – producer, engineer, orchestral arrangements
Peter Thea – engineer
George Marino – mastering at Sterling Sound, New York
John Pasche – cover design

Charts
Album 

Singles

References

UFO (band) albums
1982 albums
Chrysalis Records albums